The Maple Leaf Cricket Club is a cricket club in King City, Ontario, Canada, about 30 kilometres north of Toronto, Ontario. It was established in 1954 and operates a turf wicket facility. In 2006, it became the second ground in Canada to be approved to host One Day Internationals (ODI) by the International Cricket Council.

The facility has 5 cricket grounds. The North-West ground is the most important, and ODIs and Twenty20 Internationals have been played at this ground since the 2008 season. The Maple Leaf Cricket Club has become the primary cricket venue in Canada, assuming the role from the Toronto Cricket, Skating and Curling Club.

The facility has hosted major events including games in the 2001 ICC Trophy, two first-class matches in the 2006 ICC Intercontinental Cup, several games in the ICC Americas Championship tournaments of 2000 and 2006, and the 2008 Quadrangular Twenty20 Series.

It was the venue for all the matches in the inaugural edition of the Global T20 Canada tournament.

International record

One Day International centuries
Three ODI centuries have been scored at the venue.

One Day International five-wicket hauls
Two ODI five-wicket hauls have been taken at this venue.

See also
 Toronto Cricket, Skating and Curling Club Ground

Notes

External links
Maple Leaf Cricket Club 

Cricket grounds in Ontario
Sports venues in Ontario
Buildings and structures in King, Ontario
Sport in King, Ontario
1954 establishments in Ontario